Knopia is a monotypic genus of corals belonging to the family Clavulariidae. The only species is Knopia octocontacanalis.

The species is found in Malesia.

References

Octocorallia genera
Clavulariidae
Monotypic cnidarian genera